Santeh is a Town in Emam Rural District, Emam District, Saqqez County, Kurdistan Province, Iran. At the 2006 census, its population was 1100, in 231 families. The village is populated by Kurds.

References 

Towns and villages in Saqqez County
Kurdish settlements in Kurdistan Province